Marmorosphax boulinda is a species of skink found in New Caledonia.

References

Marmorosphax
Reptiles described in 2009
Skinks of New Caledonia
Endemic fauna of New Caledonia
Taxa named by Ross Allen Sadlier
Taxa named by Sarah A. Smith
Taxa named by Aaron M. Bauer
Taxa named by Anthony Whitaker